Capparis is a flowering plant genus, comprising around 250 species in the family Capparaceae which is included in the Brassicaceae in the unrevised APG II system. These plants are shrubs or lianas and are collectively known as caper shrubs or caperbushes. Capparis species occur over a wide range of habitat in the subtropical and tropical zones.

Plant description

The  leaves  are  simple, entire  and  rarely  reduced.  Flowers  are bisexual, bracteates, axillary or supra-axillary, solitary or in rows, in 
racemes  or  umbels. Stamens  are  many,  ovary  on  a  gynophore, 1-celled. Fruit  is  a  berry,  globose  or  ellipsoid.

Uses and ecology

Caperbushes are mainly used by humans for their fruit, which are rich in micronutrients. C. spinosa, simply known as caper, yields fruit and more importantly flower buds, which are widely used pickled as a vegetable condiment. The fruit of other species, such as karir (C. decidua), are also used for cooking; C. mitchellii and the Wild passionfruit (the local subspecies of C. spinosa) are well-known bush tucker in Australia. Mabinlang seeds (C. masaikai) are eaten as sweets.

Mabinlang is also used in Traditional Chinese Medicine. Aspalathos, the root of a shrub contained for example in the sacred Ancient Egyptian incense kp.t (kyphi), is sometimes considered to be C. spinosa. Other species have also recorded uses in herbalism and folk medicine; dedicated research is largely lacking however. Mabinlins are sweet-tasting proteins found in Mabinlang seed (and possibly in other Capparis species); at least one of them is highly resistant to heat. The market for mabinlins is not large, but this is mainly due to insufficient supply rather than to lack of demand.

The 1889 book The Useful Native Plants of Australia records that Capparis canescens was also referred to as "Mondoleu" by the indigenous people from Rockhampton area of Queensland and that "The fruit is pyriform and half an inch in diameter. It is eaten by the aborigines without any preparation." (Thozet.) Mr. P. O'Shanesy observes that the pulpy part in which these Australian species of Capparis are imbedded is a good substitute for mustard."

Caperbushes from arid regions - chiefly C. decidua - are highly useful in landscape gardening, afforestation and reforestation. They can stop soil erosion and preserve agricultural land. Any large-flowered species can be used to attract butterflies. The Crimson Rose (Atrophaneura hector), a spectacular swallowtail butterfly of South Asia, likes to visit flowers of C. spinosa in the winter months for example.

The fruit and seeds of caperbushes are relished by many birds and other animals such as spiny-tailed lizards. Capparis plants are highly important as food for certain Lepidoptera caterpillars, many of them being Pierinae:
 Appias lyncida (chocolate albatross) - recorded on C. heyneana and C. roxburghii.
 Astraptes fulgerator (two-barred flasher) - recorded on C. frondosa.
 Belenois aurota (caper white or pioneer) - recorded on C. zeylanica.
 Cepora nerissa (common gull) - mainly on C. zeylanica.
 Hebomoia glaucippe (great orangetip) - recorded on C. monii, C. roxburghii and C. sepiaria.
 Ixias marianne (white orangetip) - recorded on C. grandis, C. sepiaria, C. decidua, and C. divaricata.
 Leptosia nina (psyche) - recorded on C. zeylanica and others.
 Pareronia ceylanica (dark wanderer) - recorded on C. heydeana, C. rheedii
 Pareronia valeria (common wanderer) - recorded on C. zeylanica, C. rheedii, C. heydeana

The plant pathogenic ascomycete fungus Mycosphaerella capparis was described from a caperbush. Some species of Capparis are becoming rare, mainly due to habitat destruction, and a few are seriously threatened with extinction.

Species

Plants of the World Online currently includes:

 Capparis acutifolia Sweet
 Capparis annamensis (Baker f.) M.Jacobs
 Capparis anomala (F.Muell.) Christenh. & Byng
 Capparis arborea (F.Muell.) Maiden – Brush caper
 Capparis artensis Montrouz.
 Capparis assamica Hook.f. & Thomson
 Capparis bachii Sy, R.K.Choudhary & Joongku Lee
 Capparis batianoffii Guymer
 Capparis beneolens Gagnep.
 Capparis bodinieri H.Lév.
 Capparis brachybotrya Hallier f.
 Capparis brassii DC.
 Capparis brevispina DC.
 Capparis burmanica Collett & Hemsl.
 Capparis buwaldae M.Jacobs
 Capparis callophylla Blume
 Capparis canescens Banks ex DC.
 Capparis cantoniensis Lour.
 Capparis cartilaginea Decne.
 Capparis cataphyllosa M.Jacobs
 Capparis chingiana B.S.Sun
 Capparis chrysomeia Bojer
 Capparis cinerea M.Jacobs
 Capparis cleghornii Dunn
 Capparis corymbosa Lam.
 Capparis cucurbitina King
 Capparis daknongensis Sy, G.C.Tucker, Cornejo & Joongku Lee
 Capparis dasyphylla Merr. & F.P.Metcalf
 Capparis decidua (Forssk.) Edgew. (= C. aphylla) – karir (kirir, k(h)air, karril, etc.)
 Capparis diffusa Ridl.
 Capparis dioica Gilg
 Capparis divaricata Lam.
 Capparis diversifolia Wight & Arn.
 Capparis dongvanensis Sy, B.H.Quang & D.V.Hai
 Capparis echinocarpa Pierre ex Gagnep.
 Capparis erycibe Hallier f.
 Capparis erythrocarpos Isert
 Capparis fascicularis DC.
 Capparis fengii B.S.Sun
 Capparis flavicans Kurz
 Capparis floribunda Wight
 Capparis florida Fici & Souvann.
 Capparis fohaiensis B.S.Sun
 Capparis formosana Hemsl.
 Capparis fusifera Dunn
 Capparis gialaiensis Sy
 Capparis grandidieri Baill.
 Capparis grandiflora Wall. ex Hook.f. & Thomson
 Capparis grandis L.f.
 Capparis hainanensis Oliv.
 Capparis henryi Matsum.
 Capparis hereroensis Schinz
 Capparis heteracantha DC.
 Capparis hinnamnoensis Souvann. & Fici
 Capparis humistrata (F.Muell.) F.Muell.
 Capparis hypovellerea Gilg & Gilg-Ben.
 Capparis jacobsii Hewson
 Capparis kbangensis Sy & D.V.Hai
 Capparis kebarensis Fici
 Capparis khuamak Gagnep.
 Capparis klossii Ridl.
 Capparis koioides M.Jacobs
 Capparis kollimalayana M.B.Viswan.
 Capparis lanceolaris DC.
 Capparis lanceolatifolia Fici, Bouaman. & Souvann.
 Capparis laotica Gagnep.
 Capparis lasiantha R.Br. ex DC.
 Capparis lobbiana Turcz.
 Capparis longestipitata Heine
 Capparis longgangensis S.L.Mo & X.S.Lee ex Y.S.Huang
 Capparis loranthifolia Lindl.
 Capparis lucida (Banks ex DC.) Benth.
 Capparis macleishii (A.G.Mill.) Christenh. & Byng
 Capparis macrantha Souvann., Fici & Lanors.
 Capparis masaikai H.Lév.
 Capparis mekongensis Gagnep.
 Capparis membranifolia Kurz
 Capparis micracantha DC.
 Capparis micrantha A.Rich.
 Capparis mitchellii (Lindl. ex F.Muell.) Lindl. – wild orange (Australia), merne atwakeye (Arrernte)
 Capparis monantha M.Jacobs
 Capparis moonii Wight
 Capparis multiflora Hook.f. & Thomson
 Capparis nana Craib
 Capparis nilgiriensis Subba Rao, Kumari & V.Chandras.
 Capparis nobilis (Endl.) F.Muell. ex Benth. - devil's guts (Norfolk Island)
 Capparis nummularia DC.
 Capparis olacifolia Hook.f. & Thomson
 Capparis ornans F.Muell. ex Benth.
 Capparis pachyphylla M.Jacobs
 Capparis parvifolia Fici
 Capparis poggei Pax
 Capparis pranensis (Pierre ex Gagnep.) M.Jacobs
 Capparis pseudocerasifera Hauman
 Capparis pubiflora DC.
 Capparis pubifolia B.S.Sun
 Capparis pyrifolia Lam.
 Capparis quiniflora DC.
 Capparis radula Gagnep.
 Capparis ramonensis Danin
 Capparis rheedei DC.
 Capparis richardii Baill.
 Capparis rigida M.Jacobs
 Capparis rotundifolia Rottler
 Capparis roxburghii DC.
 Capparis rufidula M.Jacobs
 Capparis sabiifolia Hook.f. & Thomson
 Capparis sandwichiana DC. – Hawaiian caper, Maiapilo, Pua pilo (Hawaii endemic)
 Capparis sarmentosa A.Cunn. ex Benth.
 Capparis scortechinii King
 Capparis sepiaria L.; a cryptic species complex
 Capparis shanesiana F.Muell.
 Capparis shevaroyensis Sundararagh.
 Capparis siamensis Kurz
 Capparis sikkimensis Kurz
 Capparis spinosa L. – Caper(note: C. zoharyi Inocencio, D.Rivera, Obón & Alcaraz is a synonym of C. spinosa var. aegyptia (Lam.) Boiss.)
 Capparis srilankensis Sundararagh.
 Capparis subsessilis B.S.Sun
 Capparis sunbisiniana M.L.Zhang & G.C.Tucker
 Capparis tagbanuorum Fici
 Capparis tchaourembensis Fici
 Capparis tenera Dalzell
 Capparis thorelii Gagnep.
 Capparis thozetiana (F.Muell.) F.Muell.
 Capparis tomentosa Lam.
 Capparis tonkinensis Gagnep.
 Capparis trichocarpa B.S.Sun
 Capparis trinervia Hook.f. & Thomson
 Capparis trisonthiae Srisanga & Chayam.
 Capparis umbonata Lindl. - northern wild orange
 Capparis urophylla F.Chun
 Capparis velutina P.I.Forst.
 Capparis versicolor Griff.
 Capparis viburnifolia Gagnep.
 Capparis viminea Oliv.
 Capparis wui B.S.Sun
 Capparis yunnanensis Craib & W.W.Sm.
 Capparis zeylanica L. (= C. linearis Blanco) – kapchip (Wayuunaiki)
 Capparis zippeliana Miq.

Formerly placed here
{|
|- valign=top
|
 Adansonia gregorii F.Muell. (as C. gibbosa A.Cunn.)
 Anisocapparis speciosa (Griseb.) Cornejo & H.H.Iltis (as C. speciosa Griseb.)
 Boscia albitrunca (Burch.) Gilg & Benedict (as C. albitrunca Burch.)
 Boscia oleoides (as Capparis oleoides)
 Calanthea pulcherrima (Jacq.) Miers (as C. pulcherrima Jacq.)
 Colicodendron scabridum (Kunth) Seem. (as C. scabrida Kunth)
|
 Crateva magna (Lour.) DC. (as C. magna Lour.)
 Cynophalla flexuosa (L.) J.Presl – Limber caper
 Cynophalla hastata (Jacq.) J.Presl – Broadleaf caper
 Cynophalla heterophylla (Ruiz & Pav. ex DC.) Iltis & Cornejo
 Cynophalla retusa (Griseb.) Cornejo & H. H. Iltis (as C. retusa Griseb.)
 Ritchiea reflexa (Thonn.) Gilg & Benedict (as C. reflexa Thonn.)
 Sarcotoxicum salicifolium (Griseb.) Cornejo & H.H.Iltis (as C. salicifolia Griseb.)
|}

See also
 Caparica (Almada)

Footnotes

References

  (2006): Problems with DNA barcodes for species delimitation: ‘ten species’ of Astraptes fulgerator reassessed (Lepidoptera: Hesperiidae). Systematics and Biodiversity 4(2): 127–132.  PDF fulltext
  (2004): Ten species in one: DNA barcoding reveals cryptic species in the semitropical skipper butterfly Astraptes fulgerator. PNAS'' 101(41): 14812–14817.  PDF fulltext Supporting Appendices

 
Taxonomy articles created by Polbot
Taxa named by Carl Linnaeus